Penicillium oxalicum is an anamorph species of the genus Penicillium which was isolated from rhizosphere soil of pearl millet. Penicillium oxalicum produces secalonic acid D, chitinase, oxalic acid, oxaline and β-N-acetylglucosaminidase and occurs widespread in food and tropical commodities. This fungus could be used against soilborne diseases like downy mildew of tomatoes

Further reading

References 

oxalicum
Fungi described in 1915
Taxa named by Charles Thom